Count Stanisław Kostka Potocki (November 1755 – 14 September 1821) was a Polish nobleman, politician, writer, public intellectual and patron of the arts.

Life
Potocki was a son of General and starost of Lwów, Eustachy Potocki and Anna Kątska, and was a brother of Ignacy Potocki. He married Princess Aleksandra Lubomirska, the daughter of Great Marshal of the Crown, Prince Stanisław Lubomisrki, on 2 June 1776.

He visited Rome in 1780, where he was painted by Jacques-Louis David. He was an alumnus of the Collegium Nobilium in Warsaw, and later studied Polonistics, literature and arts in Wilanów. He became Great Podstoli of the Crown in 1781–1784. In 1792, he became an Artillery General of the Crown and participated in the War in Defense of the Constitution. He was a deputy of Lublin and one of the leaders of the Patriotic Party on the Four-Year Sejm.

From 1792 to 1797 he lived abroad.

Potocki was a co-founder of the Society of Friends of Science (Towarzystwo Przyjaciół Nauk, or TPN) in Warsaw in 1800. From 1807 he was a member of the Governing Commission (Komisja Rządząca), chairman of the Education Chamber (Izba Edukacyjna), and from 1810 director of the Commission of National Education (Komisja Edukacji Narodowej) in the Duchy of Warsaw.

In 1809 he became chairman of the Council of State (Rada Stanu) and the Council of Ministers (Rada Ministrów).  In 1818-20 he was chairman of the Senate.

Potocki organized archaeological excavations in Italy, inter alia in Laurentum in 1779 and Nola in 1785–1786. He collected art, mainly paintings, graphics and antique ceramics.  His collection exhibited in Wilanów in 1805, initiating one of the first museums in Poland.

Potocki died on 14 September 1821 and was buried in the church of Wilanów.

Awards

 Knight of the Order of the White Eagle, awarded in 1781.
 Knight of the Order of Saint Stanislaus
 Knight of the Order of Saint Louis
 Légion d'honneur

Works
 Świstek krytyczny, ("Pamiętnik Warszawski" 1816–18)
 Podróż do Ciemnogrodu (A Journey to Dunceville, t. 1–4 1820)

See also
 History of philosophy in Poland
 List of Poles
 Polish nobility

References

Further reading
 Potocka-Wąsowiczowa, Anna z Tyszkiewiczów. Wspomnienia naocznego świadka. Warszawa: Państwowy Instytut Wydawniczy, 1965.

External links

 Stanislaw Kostka Potocki at the Wilanow Palace Museum

1755 births
1821 deaths
Writers from Lublin
Counts of Poland
Polish male writers
18th-century Polish–Lithuanian politicians
Polish publicists
Members of the Sejm of the Polish–Lithuanian Commonwealth
Generals of the Polish–Lithuanian Commonwealth
Polish generals
Politicians of the Duchy of Warsaw
Recipients of the Legion of Honour
Knights of the Order of Saint Louis
Stanislaw Kostka Potocki
Signers of the Polish Constitution of May 3, 1791
Recipients of the Order of the White Eagle (Poland)
Politicians from Lublin